Anthony Devos Johnstone (né Anthony Cameron Johnstone; born 1973) is an American lawyer who is the nominee to serve as a United States circuit judge of the United States Court of Appeals for the Ninth Circuit.

Early life 
Johnstone earned a Bachelor of Arts degree from Yale University in 1995 and a Juris Doctor from the University of Chicago Law School in 1999. He married Helen Autumn Devos in 2004.

Career 
In 1999 and 2000, Johstone served as a law clerk for Judge Sidney R. Thomas. From 2000 to 2003, he was a litigation associate at Cravath, Swaine & Moore in New York City. From 2004 to 2008, he served as an assistant attorney general in the Montana Department of Justice. From 2008 to 2011, he served as Solicitor General of Montana. Since 2011, he has worked as a professor at the Alexander Blewett III School of Law. He is also a solo practitioner at Johnstone PLLC in Missoula, Montana.

Notable cases 

In 2008, Johnstone represented the state of Montana in a case against Canyon Ferry Road Baptist Church. The church, located in East Helena, Montana, believed that marriage may exist only between one man and one woman. The church challenged certain provisions of Montana's campaign finance law requiring reporting and disclosure of campaign contributions or expenditures.
In 2012, Johnstone was part of a legal team that represented the state of Montana in a case before the Supreme Court of the United States concerning three rivers, the Missouri River, the Madison River, and the Clark Fork River, which flow through Montana and then beyond its borders. The question was whether discrete, identifiable segments of these rivers in Montana were nonnavigable, as federal law defines that concept for purposes of determining whether the State acquired title to the riverbeds underlying those segments, when the State entered the Union in 1889.
In 2020, Johnstone was part of a legal team that represented the state of Montana in a case before the Supreme Court of the United States regarding a 2015 law passed by the Montana Legislature. The law sought to provide parental and student choice in education by enacting a scholarship program for students attending private schools. The program grants a tax credit to anyone who donates to certain organizations that in turn award scholarships to selected students attending such schools. When petitioners sought to use the scholarships at a religious school, the Montana Supreme Court struck down the program.

Nomination of the court of appeals 
On September 2, 2022, President Joe Biden announced his intent to nominate Johnstone to serve as a United States circuit judge of the United States Court of Appeals for the Ninth Circuit. On September 6, 2022, his nomination was sent to the Senate. President Biden will nominate Johnstone to the seat to be vacated by Judge Sidney R. Thomas, who will assume senior status upon confirmation of a successor. Senator Steven Daines of Montana opposed the nomination, claiming that Johnstone was too political and partisan to be a judge and claiming the White House had not adequately consulted him on the nomination. On October 12, 2022, a hearing on his nomination was held before the Senate Judiciary Committee. He was questioned about his views on election integrity and religious freedom issues. On December 1, 2022, his nomination was reported out of committee by a 11–10 vote, with Senator Lindsey Graham passed on the vote. On January 3, 2023, his nomination was returned to the President under Rule XXXI, Paragraph 6 of the United States Senate; he was renominated later the same day. On February 2, 2023, the committee deadlocked on his nomination by a 10–10 vote, which means that his nomination would be reconsidered. On February 9, 2023, his nomination was reported out of committee by an 11–10 vote. His nomination is pending before the United States Senate.

Publications

Articles

Forewords

Testimony

Notes

See also 
 Joe Biden judicial appointment controversies

References 

1973 births
Living people
20th-century American lawyers
21st-century American lawyers
Montana lawyers
People from Minneapolis
Solicitors General of Montana
University of Chicago Law School alumni
University of Montana faculty
Yale University alumni